Gölpınar can refer to:

 Gölpınar, Adıyaman
 Gölpınar Dam
 Gölpınar, Erzincan
 Gölpınar, Şanlıurfa